The Roman Catholic Diocese of Kyoto is a diocese located in the city of Kyoto in the Ecclesiastical province of Osaka 大阪 in Japan.

History
 June 17, 1937: Established as Apostolic Prefecture of Kyoto from the Diocese of Osaka
 July 12, 1951: Promoted as Diocese of Kyoto

Leadership
 Bishops of Kyoto (Roman rite)
 Bishop Paul Yoshinao Otsuka (パウロ大塚喜直) (since 1997.03.03)
 Bishop Raymond Ken’ichi Tanaka (ライムンド田中健一) (1976.07.08 – 1997.03.03)
 Bishop Paul Yoshiyuki Furuya (パウロ古屋義之) (1951.07.12 – 1976.07.08)
 Prefects Apostolic of Kyoto 京都 (Roman rite) 
 Bishop Paul Yoshiyuki Furuya (パウロ古屋義之) (1940 – 1951.07.12)
 Bishop Patrick Joseph Byrne (パトリック・バーン / 방 파트리치오), M.M. (1937.03.19 – 1940.10.10)

See also

George Hirschboeck
Roman Catholicism in Japan

Sources
 GCatholic.org
 Catholic Hierarchy
 Diocese website

External links 
 http://www.cbcj.catholic.jp/jpn/diocese/kyoto.htm

Roman Catholic dioceses in Japan
Christian organizations established in 1937
Roman Catholic dioceses and prelatures established in the 20th century
1937 establishments in Japan